The year 1724 in science and technology involved some significant events.

Astronomy
 May 22 – Giacomo F. Maraldi concludes, from his observations during an eclipse, that the corona is part of the Sun.

Mathematics
 Daniel Bernoulli expresses the numbers of the Fibonacci sequence in terms of the golden ratio.
 Isaac Watts publishes Logic, or The Right Use of Reason in the Enquiry After Truth With a Variety of Rules to Guard Against Error in the Affairs of Religion and Human Life, as well as in the Sciences.

Medicine
 Herman Boerhaave describes Boerhaave syndrome, a fatal tearing of the esophagus.

Institutions
 January 28 – The Saint Petersburg Academy of Sciences is founded by Peter I of Russia.

Births
 March 27 – Jane Colden, American botanist (died 1766)
 June 8 – John Smeaton, English civil engineer (died 1792)
 July 10 – Eva Ekeblad, Swedish agronomist, first woman in the Swedish Royal Academy of Science (died 1786)
 September 27 – Anton Friedrich Busching, German geographer (died 1793)
 December 25 – John Michell, English scientist (died 1793)
 Date unknown – Marie Anne Victoire Pigeon, French mathematician (died 1767)

Deaths
 October 18 - Jean de Hautefeuille, French inventor (born 1647)

References

 
18th century in science
1720s in science